The United States ambassador to Somalia is the most senior diplomatic representative of the United States federal government assigned to Somalia. From 2015 to 2018 the U.S. maintained a non-resident diplomatic mission in Nairobi for Somalia and its constituent autonomous regions. In January 2013, a senior American government official indicated that the United States could eventually reopen its embassy in Mogadishu, which had closed in the early 1990s. In June 2014, the U.S. State Department also announced that it would soon name a new ambassador to Somalia. In February 2015, the U.S. government nominated its first official ambassador since 1991.  In December 2018, the mission returned to Mogadishu.

Overview
Diplomatic relations between the United States and Somalia started in 1960, when the Somali Republic gained independence. The U.S. immediately recognized the Somali government and moved to establish diplomatic relations. The American embassy in Somalia's capital Mogadishu was established on July 1, 1960, with Andrew G. Lynch as Chargé d'Affaires ad interim. He was promoted to Ambassador Extraordinary and Plenipotentiary four days later on July 5, 1960.

After the collapse of the Siad Barre regime and the start of the civil war in the early 1990s, the U.S. embassy closed down. However, the American government never formally severed diplomatic ties with Somalia. The United States maintained a regular dialogue with the reconstituted Somali central government through a special envoy based in the Kenyan capital, Nairobi, before reopening its Mission to Somalia in 2013.

In January 2013, the U.S. announced that it was set to exchange diplomatic notes with the new Federal Government of Somalia, re-establishing official ties with the country for the first time in 20 years. According to the Department of State, the decision was made in recognition of the significant progress that the Somali authorities had achieved on both the political and war fronts. A senior American government official also indicated after the announcement that the United States could eventually reopen its embassy in Mogadishu.

Since the reopening of the U.S. Mission to Somalia in fall of 2013, the United States has continued to be represented in Somalia by a special envoy based in Nairobi and titled a Special Representative. On August 26, 2013, the US appointed James P. McAnulty as its Special Representative to Somalia.

In 2014, U.S. President Barack Obama nominated Katherine Dhanani to become the first U.S. Ambassador to Somalia since the U.S. closed its embassy there in 1991, but she later withdrew from the nomination process for personal reasons.

In June 2016, Stephen Schwartz was sworn in as the first U.S. ambassador to Somalia in a quarter century.  Schwartz's appointment came a year after U.S. Secretary of State John Kerry made an unannounced visit to Mogadishu.  Schwartz resigned on September 29, 2017.

President Donald J. Trump nominated Donald Yamamoto as the United States Ambassador to Somalia.  Mr. Yamamoto was appointed on October 19, 2018.

On April 15, 2021, President Joe Biden nominated Larry André Jr. to be the next United States Ambassador to Somalia. On December 18, 2021, he United States Senate confirmed his nomination by voice vote and he presented his credentials on February 7, 2022.

Ambassadors

See also
 Somalia – United States relations
 Foreign relations of Somalia
 Ambassadors of the United States
 Embassy of the United States, Mogadishu

References
Specific

General
 United States Department of State: Background notes on Somalia

External links
 United States Department of State: Chiefs of Mission for Somalia
 United States Department of State: Somalia
 United States Virtual Presence Post in Somalia

 
Somalia
United States